Hanging and Marriage is a 1722 farce by the British writer Henry Carey. Written as an afterpiece it premiered at Lincoln's Inn Fields Theatre accompanying a revival of Dryden's The Spanish Friar.

The original cast included William Bullock as Goodman Gizzard, James Spiller as Richard Stubble, John Egleton as Jerry and Jane Egleton as Mother Stubble.

References

Bibliography
 Burling, William J. A Checklist of New Plays and Entertainments on the London Stage, 1700-1737. Fairleigh Dickinson Univ Press, 1992.
 Nicoll, Allardyce. A History of Early Eighteenth Century Drama: 1700-1750. CUP Archive, 1927.

1722 plays
West End plays
Comedy plays
British plays